"Captain" Tom Franklin (born October 23, 1950) is an American professional poker player born in Fresno, California.

Franklin's poker career began in the 1970s. His first cash at the World Series of Poker (WSOP) took place in 1990, finishing 24th in the $10,000 no limit hold'em Main Event.  Franklin won his only WSOP bracelet in 1999 in the $2,500 limit Omaha event.

In 2005, Franklin won a preliminary No Limit Holdem event at the Bellagio Casino's Five Diamond Classic, picking up $434,025 for the win.

As of 2019, his total live tournament winnings exceed $3,200,000. His 28 cashes at the WSOP account for $985,084 of those winnings.

References

1950 births
American poker players
Living people
World Series of Poker bracelet winners